Jamie's Meat-Free Meals is a UK food lifestyle programme which aired on Channel 4 in 2019. In each half-hour episode, host Jamie Oliver creates inspirational vegetarian meals. Jamie also sees the increased popularity in vegetarianism in the United Kingdom and abroad.

The show premiered on 2 September 2019 and concluded with its series finale episode on 21 October 2019.

Episodes

Season 1 (2019)

Book
Veg: Easy & Delicious Meals for Everyone,

Note
Outside the United Kingdom, the series is known as Jamie's Ultimate Veg.

References

External links
 Jamie's Meat-Free Meals on Channel 4
 Recipes from the series

British cooking television shows
Channel 4 original programming
2019 British television series debuts
2019 British television series endings
CBS original programming
English-language television shows